The Joseph Wesely House and Barn are a historic homestead ensemble in Scio, Oregon, United States. The historic portions of the ensemble consist of the house, barn, and a garage, while the whole property includes other non-historic structures.

The ensemble was listed on the National Register of Historic Places in 1986.

See also
National Register of Historic Places listings in Linn County, Oregon

References

External links

Houses completed in 1913
National Register of Historic Places in Linn County, Oregon
American Craftsman architecture in Oregon
Bungalow architecture in Oregon
Houses in Linn County, Oregon
1913 establishments in Oregon